In mathematics the elliptic rational functions are a sequence of rational functions with real coefficients. Elliptic rational functions are extensively used in the design of elliptic electronic filters. (These functions are sometimes called Chebyshev rational functions, not to be confused with certain other functions of the same name).

Rational elliptic functions are identified by a positive integer order n and include a parameter ξ ≥ 1 called the selectivity factor. A rational elliptic function of degree n in x with selectivity factor ξ is generally defined as:

where

 cd(u,k) is the Jacobi elliptic cosine function.
 K() is a complete elliptic integral of the first kind.

For many cases, in particular for orders of the form n = 2a3b where a and b are integers, the elliptic rational functions can be expressed using algebraic functions alone. Elliptic rational functions are closely related to the Chebyshev polynomials: Just as the circular trigonometric functions are special cases of the Jacobi elliptic functions, so the Chebyshev polynomials are special cases of the elliptic rational functions.

Expression as a ratio of polynomials 

For even orders, the elliptic rational functions may be expressed as a ratio of two polynomials, both of order n.

      (for n even)

The above form would be true for even orders as well except that for odd orders, there will be a pole at x=∞ and a zero at x=0 so that the above form must be modified to read:

      (for n odd)

Properties

The canonical properties  

  for 
  at 
 
  for 
 The slope at x=1 is as large as possible
 The slope at x=1 is larger than the corresponding slope of the Chebyshev polynomial of the same order.

The only rational function satisfying the above properties is the elliptic rational function . The following properties are derived:

Normalization 

The elliptic rational function is normalized to unity at x=1:

Nesting property

The nesting property is written:

This is a very important property:

 If  is  known for all prime n, then nesting property gives  for all n. In particular, since  and  can be expressed in closed form without explicit use of the Jacobi elliptic functions, then all  for n of the form  can be so expressed.
Using the inversion relationship (see below), the poles can also be found.
 The nesting property implies the nesting property of the discrimination factor:

Limiting values 

The elliptic rational functions are related to the Chebyshev polynomials of the first kind  by:

Symmetry

 for n even
 for n odd

Equiripple

Inversion relationship

The following inversion relationship holds:

This implies that poles and zeroes come in pairs such that

Odd order functions will have a zero at x=0 and a corresponding pole at infinity.

Poles and Zeroes 
The zeroes of the elliptic rational function of order n will be written  or  when  is implicitly known.    The zeroes of the elliptic rational function will be the zeroes of the polynomial in the numerator of the function.

The following derivation of the zeroes of the elliptic rational function is analogous to that of determining the zeroes of the Chebyshev polynomials . Using the fact that for any z

the defining equation for the elliptic rational functions implies that

so that the zeroes are given by

Using the inversion relationship, the poles may then be calculated.

In particular, the zeroes of elliptic rational functions of order  may be algebraically expressed .

Then, from the nesting property and knowing that

where  we have:

These last three equations may be inverted:

(The  are calculated by a similar recursion.) Again, using the inversion relationship, these zeroes can be used to calculate the poles.

Particular values 

We may write the first few elliptic rational functions as:

 where

 where

 etc.

The corresponding discrimination factors are:

 etc.

The corresponding zeroes are  where n is the order and j is the number of the zero. There will be a total of n zeroes for each order.

From the inversion relationship, the corresponding poles  may be found by

References 
MathWorld
 
 

Rational functions
Elliptic functions